Edward Arthur Cartwright Windsor (born 9 March 1869, in Launceston, Tasmania) was an Australian cricketer who played first class cricket for Tasmania. He was a talented all rounder, a right-handed batsman, who could unusually bowl fast-medium, off-breaks and leg-breaks, and was successful with all three styles. His first class career lasted from the 1890–91 season until 1910–11. He died on 23 December 1953 aged 84 years.

See also
 List of Tasmanian representative cricketers

External links
 

1869 births
1953 deaths
Tasmania cricketers
Australian cricketers